Melissa Ashley Graham (born 25 October 1975 in Coventry, England) is an English singer and songwriter, who is most famous as a lead singer and a member of the 1990s British-American girlband Solid HarmoniE.

History

1995–1999: Solid HarmoniE 

Graham joined Solid HarmoniE as an original member in 1995 and signed their first record deal in New York with Jive/Zomba records. They had success in the following few years. The band enjoyed considerable success and popularity in Germany, Netherlands, Philippines, Japan, and Malaysia, where they had toured on different occasions during 1997 until 1998. They released one album and five singles until the group split up in 1999. During this time they sold over two million records and toured with the Backstreet Boys, NSYNC, and Peter Andre amongst others.

In 2014, she reunited with band members Beki Onslow and Elisa Cariera for a reunion tour and they released a new single called "Circus", which was written by Melissa Graham and Tim Laws.

2000–2003: Solo 
Graham started a solo career in 1999 and started a new album in the Netherlands where her former band had been cordially received by the fans. Her first single "Bulletproof" was released on 6 November 2000 in Germany and it was recorded to reach 89 of German top 100. Shortly after two more singles "Welcome to my World" and "Hello World" (Belle Perez cover) were released which were reasonable successful in the Netherlands. She was still to finish her solo album as of 2003, but her album was never released due to some unresolved issues with her recording company. She was also the face of Italian clothing company Freesoul.  She also appeared in a 6-page feature in FHM, making the 'Girls of Summer' Special edition 2001.

Graham and Solid HarmoniE have appeared on The National Lottery, Top of the Pops and she featured on BBC2's Never Mind the Buzzcocks with Kriss Akabusi, Katy B, Johnny Borrell, Alex Brooker and was hosted by Jack Whitehall.

Songwriting and composition
Graham then went on to write a number one single for the girl band Raffish with "Plaything". She also co-wrote the title track to The Afroz album, called "Ain't It Funny".

In 2015, she co-wrote and sang on Warriors of the Dystotheque's first album The Future Is Ours. The track was called "Atom Vibe".  This album was played on BBC Radio 2 and BBC Radio 6 Music, as well as on Across the Line, Electric Mainline, RTE 2XM and BBC CWR.

In 2017, she was commissioned to write and produce the title track and incidental music for sitcom LaLas Ladiesz, which stars Kulvinder Ghir.

Academic life

She studied Paramedic Science at the University of Coventry and was awarded a First Class Honours Degree in Emergency Practice from Derby University. She still holds a paramedic licence. In 2020, Graham became a Non-Medical Prescriber and continues to study Advanced Clinical Practice at masters level.

Acting
Graham has attended the  BSA (Birmingham School of Acting) and started her acting career in a few short films. She took a small but pertinent role in the short sci fi film I.R.I.S. with film director Hazraf 'HaZ' Dullul

In 2016, she starred in Mera Mahi NRI alongside actors Kulvinder Ghir (Goodness Gracious Me) and Hardy Sandu. This was released early in 2017.

She also took a featured role in the upcoming sci fi thriller The Beyond, which is the brain child of Hazraf 'HaZ' Dulull.  The Beyond will be available in the US on January 9, 2018 via Amazon, Google Play, iTunes, Vimeo, Vudu, Microsoft Xbox, YouTube, Cox Communications, Dish Communications, Suddenly and Verizion Fios. She was credited as assistant production manager and casting director for this movie.

DJing

Graham started DJing in 2016 and  produced her first EP as one half of the EAT VEGANS collective.  She favours deep and progressive house but plays a few different genres and played at Sol House Ibiza in 2016, the monastery, AA live  and Miss Moneypennys.  She released her first EP with Repeat After Me records under the pseudonym 'CattoniC'.

As writer

Graham has contributed to Dr Marianne Trent's Book The Grief Collective and was acknowledged for helping Dr FFione Davies produce the footage in Emergency Care of Minor Trauma in Children: A Practical Handbook.

In 2020, she started writing her first screenplay.

References

External links
 Official website

1975 births
Musicians from Coventry
Solid HarmoniE members
Living people
English women pop singers
21st-century English women singers
21st-century English singers